Chakhmaq Chukhur (also Romanized as Chakhmāq Chūkhūr; also known as Chakhmāq Chokūr) is a village in Arshaq-e Gharbi Rural District, Moradlu District, Meshgin Shahr County, Ardabil Province, Iran. At the 2006 census, its population was 54, in 14 families.

References 

Tageo

Towns and villages in Meshgin Shahr County